Marco Antonio Juan Andrés Cariola Barroilhet (2 November 1932 – 6 September 2020) was a Chilean lawyer and politician who served as a Senator.

References

1932 births
2020 deaths
Independent Democratic Union politicians
University of Chile alumni